Gavin Weiland Huff (born 22 October 2000), better known under his middle name Weiland, is an American rapper, singer, music producer, and songwriter from Tampa, Florida. Weiland is currently signed to Steven Victor's Victor Victor label in a joint venture with Universal Music Group and is known for his studio albums Weiland and Vices released under the labels. He is also known for providing American rapper and collaborator Yeat with his recording template.

Career

2016-2019: Beginnings, Packrunner, and Grimey Youth
Weiland began releasing music on the music platform SoundCloud in 2016. After the release of a number of songs on the platform, he recalls getting noticed by members of the rap collective Slayworld along with its associated producers. His rise to fame was accredited to schemes such as a supposed Auto-Tune implant and misdemeanors involving rocket launchers. In April 2018, he released his single "Who's Better" with American rapper and member of the Slayworld collective Summrs. In May 2018, he released his EP Grimey Youth.

2020-present: Victor Victor, Weiland, and Vices
Weiland signed to music executive Steven Victor's Victor Victor record label in 2020, notable for being the label of notable musicians like drill rapper Pop Smoke and producer 808 Melo. In 2021, he grabbed the attention of record producer Mike Dean who helped him with the production of his album Vices. In October 2021, he released his single "Heart Stop". In December 2021, he released a single titled "Blaming Myself" with Mike Dean. In a February 2022 interview with Lyrical Lemonade, American musician KayCyy hinted at a collaboration between Weiland and American singer Toro y Moi for his upcoming album. In April 2022, he released his second studio album  titled Vices on UMG/Victor Victor Worldwide. It debuted at number six on the Spotify "Top Albums Debut USA" chart. Later that year, he announced his upcoming third album American Pop, which is still being worked on as of February 2023.

Musical style 
Weiland's earlier music was notable for his signature usage of vocal effects like reverb and AutoTune along with the unique style of plugg trap beats that he used. This style largely contained elements from genres such as trap rap, cloud rap, and plugg music. In late 2020, he revealed he had transitioned from this older sound to a newer retro synthpop and coldwave esque sound. Weiland unveiled this sound with the release two singles and his most recent album Vices. It is also noted that the rapper drives inspiration from musicians such as Kanye West, Imogen Heap, and Daft Punk.

Discography

Studio albums

Mixtapes

Extended plays

Singles 

 "Colors" (2018)
 "slilppnyhik6febe.onion" (2020)
 "Heart Stop" (2021)
 "Blaming Myself" (2021) (with Mike Dean)

References

External links 
 

2000 births
21st-century American male musicians
Living people
People from Tampa, Florida
Rappers from Florida